The Great Heathen Army is the twelfth studio album by Swedish melodic death metal band Amon Amarth. It was released on 5 August 2022, through Metal Blade Records and Sony Music.

Critical reception 

Dan Slessor of Kerrang! described the album as "a step back towards their melodic death metal origins, and it is definitely to their betterment, delivering perhaps the strongest collection since 2008's Twilight of the Thunder God".

Blabbermouth.net portrayed the album as "Both an unapologetic, festival-ready dose of new, gleaming, Viking-populated anthems, and one of the darkest and most brutal albums they have yet made".

Track listing

Personnel 
Amon Amarth
 Olavi Mikkonen − lead guitar
 Johan Hegg − vocals
 Ted Lundström − bass
 Johan Söderberg − rhythm guitar
 Jocke Wallgren − drums

Other personnel
 Biff Byford − vocals (track 7)
 Andy Sneap − production, mixing, mastering

Charts

Weekly charts

Year-end charts

References 

2022 albums
Amon Amarth albums
Metal Blade Records albums